The Constitution of the Republic of North Macedonia is a codified constitution outlining North Macedonia's system of government and basic human rights. It was adopted in the Parliament of the then-Republic of Macedonia on 17 November 1991.

In 2001 it was announced that the country had adopted amendments to its Constitution which enshrined 15 basic amendments and has granted rights to the country's ethnic Albanian population, as part of the Ohrid Agreement. 

In 2018, the government agreed to the Prespa agreement with Greece, where the constitutional name of the country would be changed from the "Republic of Macedonia" to the "Republic of North Macedonia" in exchange for assurances that Greece would no longer object to North Macedonia's integration in international organizations. Following ratification of the agreement and a non-binding referendum, Macedonia's Parliament approved a draft constitutional amendment on 3 December 2018. On 11 January 2019, the final version of the amendment was approved by parliament and was published the next day in the Official Gazette, giving force to the amendment.

Policy details 
The constitution stresses the importance of equality for all citizens. In Article 1, it is stated that "The Republic of North Macedonia is a sovereign, independent, democratic and social state. The sovereignty of the Republic of North Macedonia is indivisible, inalienable and nontransferable." Other examples of articles state things such  as the fact that Skopje is the capital of the country, and that the Cyrillic alphabet is the official alphabet of Macedonian (according to Article 7). Other sections of the constitution concerns rights pertaining to the freedoms and rights of citizens, ideas concerning the organization of the government and judicial systems, the separate constitutional court of North Macedonia. There are also sections that detail the local government's rights, and international relations. In total, the constitution has 134 articles; it also has 32 amendments that have been put in place.

References

External links

Constitution of the Republic of North Macedonia

Government of North Macedonia
North Macedonia